XHLZ-FM may refer to:

XHLZ-FM (Coahuila) in Torreón, Capital 103.5 FM and 710 AM
XHLZ-FM (Michoacán) in Lázaro Cárdenas, La Pura Ley 93.9 FM